Closer to the Flame may refer to:

 Closer to the Flame (Dave Edmunds album), 1990
 Closer to the Flame (Joel Kroeker album), 2007